The North Hockey Association runs hockey leagues based in the North of England. It feeds teams into the Men's and Women's England Hockey Leagues and takes teams from sub-regional (county) leagues, such as the Yorkshire Hockey Association.

League Structure 
As with most field hockey leagues, it has separate male and female competitions.  Both male and female systems consist of a Premier Division, Division 1 and Division 2.  In the male competition, there are two separate Division 2s, split geographically into East and West. For the female competition, there are four separate Division 2s, split geographically into North East, South East, South West and North West.

Counties and Associations 
The North Hockey Association consists of seven Counties and Associations.
 Cheshire Hockey Association (Official Website)
 Cumbria Hockey Association (Official Website)
 Manx Hockey Association (Official Website)
 Lancashire County Hockey Association (Official Website)
 Greater Manchester Hockey Association (Official Website)
 Sheffield and District Women’s Hockey Association (Official Website)
 Yorkshire Hockey Association (Official Website)

Feeder Leagues 
Promotion to, and relegation from, the regional 2nd Divisions occurs with the following feeder leagues:
 Cheshire Women's League (Official Website)
 North West Hockey League (Official Website)
 North East Hockey League (Official Website)
 Yorkshire Hockey Association (Official Website)

Recent Champions 

North Hockey Men's League Premier Division

North Hockey Women's League Premier Division

References

Field hockey governing bodies in England
Field hockey leagues in England